Nikolskoye-na-Yemanche is a rural locality (a selo) in Staronikolskoye Rural Settlement, Khokholsky District, Voronezh Oblast, Russia. The population was 410 as of 2010. There are 2 streets.

Geography 
Nikolskoye-na-Yemanche is located 24 km south of Khokholsky (the district's administrative centre) by road. Staronikolskoye is the nearest rural locality.

References 

Rural localities in Khokholsky District